Charles Morrow may refer to:
 Charles William Morrow, member of the Legislative Assembly of British Columbia
 Charles Morrow (Illinois politician), member of the Illinois House of Representatives
 Charlie Morrow, American sound artist, composer and performer